Myeloid differentiation primary response 88 (MYD88) is a protein that, in humans, is encoded by the MYD88 gene.

Model organisms 

Model organisms have been used in the study of MYD88 function. The gene was originally discovered and cloned by Dan Liebermann and Barbara Hoffman in mice.	In that species it is a universal adapter protein as it is used by almost all TLRs (except TLR 3) to activate the transcription factor NF-κB. Mal (also known as TIRAP) is necessary to recruit Myd88 to TLR 2 and TLR 4, and MyD88 then signals through IRAK. It also interacts functionally with amyloid formation and behavior in a transgenic mouse model of Alzheimer's disease.
			

A conditional knockout mouse line, called Myd88tm1a(EUCOMM)Wtsi was generated as part of the International Knockout Mouse Consortium program — a high-throughput mutagenesis project to generate and distribute animal models of disease to interested scientists. Male and female animals underwent a standardized phenotypic screen to determine the effects of deletion.  Twenty-one tests were carried out on homozygous mutant animals, revealing one abnormality: male mutants had an increased susceptibility to bacterial infection.

Function 

The MYD88 gene provides instructions for making a protein involved in signaling within immune cells. The MyD88 protein acts as an adapter, connecting proteins that receive signals from outside the cell to the proteins that relay signals inside the cell.

In innate immunity, the MyD88 plays a pivotal role in immune cell activation through Toll-like receptors (TLRs), which belong to large group of pattern recognition receptors (PRR). In general, these receptors sense common patterns which are shared by various pathogens – Pathogen-associated molecular pattern (PAMPs), or which are produced/released during cellular damage – damage-associated molecular patterns (DAMPs).

TLRs are homologous to Toll receptors, which were first described in the onthogenesis of fruit flies Drosophila, being responsible for dorso-ventral development. Hence, TLRs have been proved in all animals from insects to mammals. TLRs are located either on the cellular surface (TLR1, TLR2, TLR4, TLR5, TLR6) or within endosomes (TLR3, TLR7, TLR8, TLR9) sensing extracellular or phagocytosed pathogens, respectively. TLRs are integral membrane glycoproteins with typical semicircular-shaped extracellular parts containing leucine-rich repeats responsible for ligand binding, and Intracellular parts containing Toll-Interleukin receptor (TIR) domain.

After ligand binding, all TLRs apart from TLR3, interact with adaptor protein MyD88. Another adaptor protein, which is activated by TLR3 and TLR4, is called TIR domain-containing adapter-inducing IFN-β (TRIF). Subsequently, these proteins activate two important transcription factors:

 NF-κB is a dimeric protein responsible for expression of various inflammatory cytokines, chemokines and adhesion and costimulatory molecules, which in turn triggers acute inflammation and stimulation of adaptive immunity
 IRFs is a group of proteins responsible for expression of type I interferons setting the so-called antiviral state of a cell.

TLR7 and TLR9 activate both NF-κB and IRF3 through MyD88-dependent and TRIF-independent pathway, respectively.

The human ortholog MYD88 seems to function similarly to mice, since the  immunological phenotype of human cells deficient in MYD88 is similar to cells  from MyD88 deficient mice. However, available evidence suggests that MYD88 is dispensable for human resistance to common viral infections and to all but a few pyogenic bacterial infections, demonstrating a major difference  between mouse and human immune responses. Mutation in MYD88 at position 265 leading to a change from leucine to proline have been identified in many human lymphomas including ABC subtype of diffuse large B-cell lymphoma and Waldenström's macroglobulinemia.

Interactions 

Myd88 has been shown to interact with:

 IRAK1
 IRAK2 
 Interleukin 1 receptor, type I 
 RAC1  
 TLR 4

Gene polymorphisms 

Various single nucleotide polymorphisms (SNPs) of the MyD88 have been identified. and for some of them an association with susceptibility to various infectious diseases and to some autoimmune diseases like ulcerative colitis was found.

References

Further reading

External links 
 

Immune system
Human proteins
Genes mutated in mice